Sinus disease, allergies, and asthma have been shown to be intimately related through recent research. Moreover, gastroesophageal reflux disease (GERD), laryngopharyngeal reflux disease (LPRD) and/or snoring or sleep apnea are often present as well. "Chronic Airway-Digestive Inflammatory Disease" (CAID) is a phrase which has been coined by Dr. Jordan S. Josephson, M.D., F.A.C.S. and Dr. Jens Ponikeau, M.D. to describe this very complex set of problems which are caused by inflammation. This term was first described in a book entitled Sinus Relief Now. CAID directly affects the upper respiratory system (the nose and the sinuses), the lower airway (the lungs) and the GI tract and these areas are intimately connected.

CAID begins when bacteria, virus, fungus (mold), pollutants or other irritants, or an allergen initiate an inflammatory response in the airway (both upper and lower). Inflammatory responses may then lead to a number of related reactions. For example, allergies often worsen sinus problems, and sinus problems and allergies can trigger or worsen asthma. Reflux can be set off by sinus problems and reflux can also send acids up to the upper airway and worsen the inflammation already occurring secondary to infection. Inflammation in these different areas are all related and the reaction can cause the symptoms to worsen in a vicious cycle.

CAID can also impact organs beyond the respiratory (breathing) and digestive systems. Heart disease, stroke, infertility, painful headaches and chronic fatigue syndrome may be linked to CAID. CAID must first be diagnosed before each of these conditions can be properly treated.

Available treatment options include over the counter remedies, holistic medicines and allopathic treatments, prescription medications, surgery and lifestyle changes.

Unfortunately, CAID is a chronic disease, which is not cured by medicines and/or surgery but definitely can be controlled with good comprehensive care. However, symptoms may be controlled and unnecessary pain alleviated.

One treatment option is the so-called Five Part Plan for treatment described in the book Sinus Relief Now which includes:

Using irrigation to care for sinuses,

Managing the level of mould, allergens, and other pollutants in homes, offices, and cars, by cleaning up your environment

Knowing which foods trigger CAID symptoms, and removing them from your diet

Being compliant with your treatment. Both Eastern Alternative and Western Traditional Medicine Treatments complement each other and should be investigated to provide a comprehensive holistic approach.
Embracing life-altering changes to enjoy your health (i.e. smoking cessation).

References

Digestive diseases